Riverview was an unincorporated community located in Niobrara County, Wyoming, United States.

References

Unincorporated communities in Niobrara County, Wyoming
Unincorporated communities in Wyoming